Rekat-e Olya (also Romanized as Rekāt-e ‘Olyā and Rekat Olya; also known as Rekāt-e Bālā, Rekāt, Rekāt-e ‘Olyā, Rīkat-e Bālā, and Rokāt Bālā) is a village in Baqeran Rural District, in the Central District of Birjand County, South Khorasan Province, Iran. At the 2006 census, its population was 86, in 35 families.

References 

Populated places in Birjand County